Devils Fork was an unincorporated community located in  Wyoming and Raleigh counties, West Virginia, United States. 

Part of the community was renamed Stephenson. The area's coal mines and a portion of its community (see Mine Map 322942) resided in the vicinity of Amigo in Raleigh County.

References 

Unincorporated communities in West Virginia
Unincorporated communities in Wyoming County, West Virginia
Coal towns in West Virginia